Helensburgh Cemetery is an operational burial ground, dating from the mid 19th century, on the Old Luss Road in Helensburgh, Argyll, Scotland. Together with its boundary walls, lodge, gatepiers and gates it is designated as a Category B listed building by Historic Scotland.

The graveyard contains several fine monuments, including one to Bonar Law, the former Prime Minister, whose ashes are buried at Westminster Abbey.

Notable burials
 John Logie Baird (1888–1946), scientist and inventor of television and his wife Celia whose remains were brought over from South Africa to be buried with John Logie Baird
 David White Finlay (1840–1923) physician
 Hugh Kerr (1808–1891) tobacco merchant in Kentucky, monument by William Leiper
 Alexander Nisbet Paterson (1856–1947) and his artist wife Maggie Hamilton, monument by William Leiper
 John Ure (1824–1901), Lord Provost of Glasgow
 Alexander Ure, 1st Baron Strathclyde (1853–1928) son of John Ure
 Monument to Bonar Law by A. N. Paterson (cenotaph)

War graves
There are 40 Commonwealth service personnel buried here whose graves are registered and maintained by the Commonwealth War Graves Commission, 21 from the First World War and 19 from the Second World War.

References

External links
 

Category B listed buildings in Argyll and Bute
Cemeteries in Scotland
19th-century establishments in Scotland
Helensburgh
Commonwealth War Graves Commission cemeteries in Scotland